Coyhaique, also spelled Coihaique in Patagonia, is the capital city of both the Coyhaique Province and the Aysén Region of Chile. Founded by settlers in 1929, it is a young city. Until the twentieth century, Chile showed little interest in exploiting the remote Aisén region. The Carretera Austral southern highway opened in the 1980s.

Geography and climate

It is surrounded by rivers (Simpson and Coyhaique) and by mountains. The mountains may be snow-covered throughout the year, thus Coihaique is sometimes called the city of eternal snow.

Under the Köppen climate classification, Coyhaique has an oceanic climate (Cfb), though it is considerably less wet than coastal settlements like Puerto Montt or Puerto Aysén since the coastal mountains provide considerable shielding from the westerly winds. Temperatures are moderate during the months of November through April, while from May until October, temperatures are chilly and accompanied by the possibility of snowfall.

Demographics
According to the 2002 census of the National Statistics Institute, Coyhaique has 50,041 inhabitants (25,453 men and 24,588 women). Of these, 44,850 (89.6%) lived in urban areas and 5,191 (10.4%) in rural areas. The population grew by 15.6% (6,744 persons) between the 1992 and 2002 censuses.

Administration
As a commune, Coyhaique is a third-level administrative division of Chile administered by a municipal council, headed by an alcalde who is directly elected every four years. The 2012-2016 alcalde is Alejandro Huala Canumán (PS). He was preceded by Omar Muñoz Sierra (UDI) from 2008 to 2012 and David Sandoval Plaza (also UDI), who served from 2000 to 2008.

Within the electoral divisions of Chile, Coyhaique is represented in the Chamber of Deputies by René Alinco (PDC) and the former mayor David Sandoval as part of the 59th electoral district, which includes the entire Aysén Region. The commune is represented in the Senate by Antonio Horvath Kiss (RN) and Patricio Walker Prieto (PDC) as part of the 18th senatorial constituency (Aysén Region).

Society and culture

The town square is laid out in the shape of a pentagon in honor of the Carabineros, the national police force. A Carabinero general was one of the town's founders. Novelist and poet, Ivonne Coñuecar, is from  Coyhaique and was awarded the Santiago Municipal Literature Award in 2019.

Transport and tourism
Travellers arrive by air through the local airport, by sea through ships that dock at Puerto Chacabuco (near Puerto Aysén, about one hour to the west of Coyhaique), and by road. Two border crossings near Coyhaique allow entry into Argentina. Fly fishing is popular along its rivers and lakes.

Other airlines also provide services. Connections from Balmaceda airport to points further south in Chile will often require a connection in Puerto Montt.

Its sole ski resort, El Fraile, provides two ski lifts and a couple of tracks but no on-site lodging.

Hotspots
 Simpson and Coyhaique Rivers, well known for fly fishing
 Piedra del Indio, an Indian-shaped rock besides the Simpson River
 Happy Stone, a large rock in the middle of a plain where young people go to party

Pollution 
A 2018 study by the World Health Organization (WHO) looking at 4,357 cities in 108 countries worldwide showed Coyhaique to have the worst air quality in the Americas and ranked it 139th unhealthiest in the world. 

This is mostly due to wood smoke from fires the residents light for warmth in the winter months of June and July. Because the city is located between two mountainous ridges, the smoke cannot be dispersed down the valley and away and heat inversion compresses it into a dense cloud of smoke.

In May 2016, the Chilean government also declared Coyhaique “saturated” by harmful fine particles (PM2.5) which are linked to cardiopulmonary diseases and lung cancer.

References

External links

 Coyhaique's city hall website
 Patagonia House, Bed and Breakfast
 Salvaje Corazon, Tour Guides

Ski areas and resorts in Chile
Communes of Chile
Capitals of Chilean regions
Capitals of Chilean provinces
Populated places established in 1929
Populated places in Coyhaique Province
1929 establishments in Chile